Wipfeld is a municipality in the district of Schweinfurt in Bavaria, Germany.

Twin towns

Wipfeld is twinned with:

 Follina, Italy

References

Schweinfurt (district)